Rickettsia asiatica is a tick-borne pathogenic species borne by Ixodes ovatus. The type strain of Rickettsia asiatica sp. nov. is IO-1T (=CSUR R2T).

References

Further reading

Hechemy, Karim E., Philippe Brouqui, and James E. Samuel, eds.Rickettsiology and Rickettsial Diseases. Wiley-Blackwell, 2009.

External links
LPSN

Rickettsiaceae
Bacteria described in 2006